John Glynne may refer to:

Sir John Glynne (judge) (1602–1666), lawyer and member of parliament for Caernarvon, Westminster, and Caernarvonshire
Sir John Glynne, 6th Baronet (1712–1777), member of parliament for Flintshire and Flint

See also
Glynne baronets
John Glynn (1722–1779), English lawyer and MP